Wucheng is a town in  Lishi District, Lüliang, in western Shanxi province, People's Republic of China. The Taiyuan-Zhongwei-Yinchuan Railway runs through Wucheng, but there is apparently no passenger station here; in addition, China National Highway 307 and G20 Qingdao–Yinchuan Expressway pass through the town. , it has 16 villages under its administration.

See also
List of township-level divisions of Shanxi

References

Township-level divisions of Shanxi